Acrosathe pacifica is a species of stiletto fly in the family Therevidae.

References

Therevidae
Articles created by Qbugbot
Insects described in 1923